Grant D. Aldonas is an American attorney who served as Under Secretary of Commerce for International Trade during the presidency of George W. Bush. He also served as an advisor to Mitt Romney during his 2012 presidential campaign. Aldonas graduated from the University of Minnesota and received a Juris Doctor from the same school.

References

External links
Video of Aldonas on C-SPAN

Living people
University of Minnesota alumni
Year of birth missing (living people)
Under Secretaries of Commerce for International Trade